The 2018–19 EuroLeague Women was the 61st edition of the European women's club basketball championship organized by FIBA, and the 23rd edition since being rebranded as the EuroLeague Women.

Team allocation
A total of 20 teams from 11 countries participated in the 2018–19 EuroLeague Women.

Teams
League positions of the previous season shown in parentheses (TH: EuroLeague Women title holders):

Round and draw dates

Schedule

Draw
The draw was held on 5 July 2018 at the FIBA headquarters in Munich, Germany. The 16 teams were drawn into two groups of eight. For the draw, the teams were seeded into eight seeds.

Qualifying round

|}

Regular season

The regular season started on 24 October 2018 and ended on 20 February 2019.

The four top teams of each group qualified for the quarterfinals.

If teams are level on record at the end of the Regular Season, tiebreakers are applied in the following order:
 Head-to-head record
 Head-to-head point differential
 Head-to-head points scored
 Point differential for the entire regular season
 Points scored for the entire regular season

Group A

Group B

Quarterfinals

|}

First leg

Second leg

Final four

Semifinals

Third place game

Final

Awards

This year the regular season awards decided by fan vote.

EuroLeague MVP
  Breanna Stewart ( Dynamo Kursk)

EuroLeague Final Four MVP
 Brittney Griner ( UMMC Ekaterinburg)

Coach of the Year
  Lucas Mondelo ( Dynamo Kursk)

Most Entertaining Player of the Year
  Marine Johannès ( Bourges Basket)

Best Frontcourt Player of the Year
  Breanna Stewart ( Dynamo Kursk)

Best Wing of the Year
  Haley Peters ( Carolo Basket)

Best Guard of the Year
  Marine Johannès ( Bourges Basket)

Young Player of the Year
  Alexia Chartereau ( Bourges Basket)

Individual leaders

Stats includes postseason games and are sorted on average per game.

Points per game

Rebounds per game

Assists per game

Other statistics

Individual game highs

Team leaders

Stats includes postseason games and are sorted on average per game.

References

External links
 

2018–19 in European women's basketball leagues
EuroLeague Women seasons